William Brydges, 4th Baron Chandos (ca. 1552 – 1602) was an English peer and politician.

He was the younger son and heir of Edmund Brydges, 2nd Baron Chandos and Dorothy, the youngest daughter and child of Sir Edmund Braye, 1st Baron Braye.

In 1588, he was captain of a company of the Gloucestershire Trained Bands in Queen Elizabeth I's army facing the invasion threat of the Spanish Armada.

He succeeded his elder brother as Baron Chandos, and served as Lord Lieutenant of Gloucestershire and Member of Parliament for Cricklade.

Family
Chandos married Mary Hopton (d. 1624), daughter of Sir Owen Hopton of Cockfield, Yoxford, and Anne Echingham.
Their children included;
 Grey Brydges, his heir.
 Beatrix Brydges (d. 1602), married Sir Henry Poole of Sapperton, MP for Cirencester.
 Frances Brydges, married firstly, Sir Thomas Smith of Parson's Green, Master of Requests, and secondly, Thomas Cecil, 1st Earl of Exeter.
 Joan or Eleanor Brydges (d. 1616) married Sir Ambrose or Sir Thomas Turville, cupbearer to Anne of Denmark.

References
http://thepeerage.com/p1636.htm#i16353

Brydges
1550s births
1602 deaths
17th-century English nobility
English MPs 1572–1583
English MPs 1584–1585
English MPs 1586–1587
Gloucestershire Militia officers
Lord-Lieutenants of Gloucestershire
16th-century English nobility
Members of the Parliament of England (pre-1707) for Cricklade
Wi
4
Year of birth uncertain